Protalebrella brasiliensis, the Brazilian leafhopper, is a species of leafhopper in the family Cicadellidae.

References

Further reading

External links

 

Alebrini